Kang Chang-il (born 28 January 1952) is a South Korean politician who is member of the National Assembly since 2004.Kang is ambassador to Japan from January 2021 to 2022.

Early life and career 
Kang Chang-il was born on 28 January 1952 in Bukjeju County (now Jeju City), Jeju Province. He graduated from Seoul National University. Kang lived in Japan while he received a PhD degree from the  University of Tokyo.

Political career 
Kang was nominated by the Uri Party in the 2004 legislative election and was elected in Jeju City and Bukjeju County, Jeju Province. After that, he was elected successively in the 2008, 2012 and 2016 elections.

On 15 June 2017, he was elected president of the Japan–Korea Parliamentarians' Union.

On 23 November 2020, President Moon Jae-in appointed Kang Chang-il as the new ambassador to Japan. 
Press Secretary of Japanese MOFA, Tomoyuki Yoshida, reviled on 3 February 2021 that the South Korean side announcement of the appointment was without agrément, and promptly after the announcement, Chief of protocol Atsushi Kaifu had told to embassy of South Korea in Tokyo that it was extremely regrettable to have deviated customary international law. At the timing of 3 February 2021, as Kang had not yet completed procedures to become an ambassador, including Letter of credence, he was still called as "the next ambassador to Japan."

An official of the South Korean presidential office said that the appointment of Kang reflects Moon's willingness to improve bilateral relations following Yoshihide Suga's appointment as Prime Minister.
Kang has pledged to make every effort to improve and normalize relations between South Korea and Japan, following deterioration in relations over issues of wartime labor and comfort women. 
He has relayed Moon's statement that the two governments should prepare solutions to the pending problems through dialogue and that they should cooperate where possible, including on the Tokyo Olympic Games.

References

External links 
 Official website of Kang Chang-il
 Embassy of Korea

1952 births
Living people
People from Jeju Province
South Korean Buddhists
Members of the National Assembly (South Korea)
Minjoo Party of Korea politicians
Seoul National University School of Law alumni
University of Tokyo alumni
Ambassadors of South Korea to Japan